Plantago moorei, also called Moore's plantain, is a species of plant in the family Plantaginaceae. It is endemic to Falkland Islands. Its natural habitat is temperate shrubland. It is threatened by habitat loss.

References

moorei
Flora of the Falkland Islands
Endangered plants
Taxonomy articles created by Polbot